Ponte Leccia (or Ponte-Leccia) is a French village, part of the municipality (commune) of Morosaglia, in the department of Haute-Corse, Corsica. Its name in Corsican language is U Ponte à a Leccia.

Geography
Situated at the confluence between Asco and Golo rivers, it lies few km in the east of Morosaglia and is  far from Corte, 46 from Bastia, 60 from Calvi and 100 from Ajaccio.

Transport
Ponte Leccia has a railway station on the CFC line Ajaccio-Bastia, on the junction point with the line to Calvi. It is crossed by the national roads N193 and N197.

It has been used as a special stage in the Tour de Corse.

Gallery

See also
Corsican people

References

External links

Villages in Corsica
Tour de Corse